Emma Gilbey Keller (b. ca. 1961) is an author and journalist, based in New York City. She specializes in writing about women and women's issues. She has written two books: The Lady: The Life and Times of Winnie Mandela (Jonathan Cape, 1993) and The Comeback: Seven Stories of Women Who Went From Career to Family and Back Again (Bloomsbury, 2008)

Personal life
Gilbey Keller was born in London, the daughter of businessman Anthony Gilbey and journalist Lenore Gilbey. She was educated at New Hall School, and King's College London, and was a teacher before switching to journalism. Her decision to switch careers was influenced by the death of her mother who was murdered in New York in 1983 in a random hotel break in. Gilbey Keller moved to New York in 1986 and has lived there off and on ever since.

She is married to Bill Keller, former executive editor of The New York Times, now of The Marshall Project, and has two daughters, Molly and Alice. She is currently writing a memoir about her experience of motherhood.

Career
Gilbey Keller's first job in journalism was at Roll Call newspaper on Capitol Hill in Washington D.C. and from there she went to work in the investigative unit of ABC News. In early 1990 she moved to Johannesburg, South Africa, and began writing features for The Weekly Mail. Assigned to cover Winnie Mandela's trial on kidnapping and assault charges for the paper, she was eventually commissioned to write Mrs. Mandela's biography. Following its publication Gilbey Keller became a feature writer for the London Sunday Times, specializing in English and American trials and headline crimes.

Gilbey Keller was then commissioned to write a book about the Gloucestershire serial killing couple, Fred and Rosemary West, but left the project after West contacted her to cooperate. She was told not to trust him by members of the FBI Behavioral Science Unit at Quantico, VA.
She became the New York correspondent for The Sunday Telegraph and a contributing editor to the Telegraph Magazine.
Over the years, she has written for The Spectator, The Literary Review, Vanity Fair, The New Yorker, Slate and The New York Times.

Gilbey Keller was an early contributor to the newly created Guardian US from 2012 to 2014 and while there created The Living Hour, a regular web-based discussion about the way we live.

Controversy
In January 2014, articles by Gilbey Keller and her husband about cancer blogger Lisa Bonchek Adams generated substantial controversy about the nature of social media, digital journalism and terminal illness.  The incident came to be known in social media as KellerGate.

On January 8, 2014, Gilbey Keller wrote an article about Bonchek Adams in The Guardian about whether people with terminal illness should be so public on social media. She wrote "Should there be boundaries in this kind of experience? Is there such a thing as TMI? Are her tweets a grim equivalent of deathbed selfies? Why am I so obsessed?" The article was subsequently retracted by the editor, in part due to complaints by Adams and her family that the article "completely misrepresented the nature of her illness and her reasons for tweeting, was riddled with inaccuracies, and quoted from a private direct message to Keller through Twitter published without permission." A week later, Bill Keller published his own article about Bonchek Adams in The New York Times called "Heroic Measures," this time questioning whether Bonchek Adams's efforts to prolong her life were worth the effort and cost.

As a result, Gilbey Keller resigned from her position at The Guardian.

References

External links
http://emmagkeller.com/blog/books/

Living people
People educated at New Hall School
Alumni of King's College London
Year of birth missing (living people)